Simon d'Authie or d'Autie (born 1180/90; died after 1235) was a lawyer, priest and Old French trouvère. He was from Authie, and died at Amiens. Up to eleven works are sometimes attributed to him, but only five are certain.

From at least 1223 Simon served as a canon, and in 1228 as dean of the chapter, at Amiens Cathedral. He worked as a lawyer for the Abbey of Saint Vaast in a lawsuit against lay assessors (1222–26) and a case involving the chapter of Arras Cathedral (1232).

Simon composed a jeu-parti with Gilles le Vinier ("Maistre Simon, d'un esample nouvel") and another two with Hue le Maronnier ("Symon, le quel emploie" and "Symon, or me faites"). The latter two were judged by the trouvère Adam de Givenchi. Both Gilles and Adam appear in the same documents relating to Amiens and Saint Vaast. Although music survives for six other pieces of Simon's, it is irregular, difficult to interpret in terms of modes, lacking in mensural notation and being open to different interpretations of its intervals. One interpretation of Tant ai amours gives it an interval of a twelfth.

Sources
Theodore Karp. "Simon d'Authie" Grove Music Online. Oxford Music Online. Oxford University Press, accessed 5 April 2013.

Trouvères
13th-century French Roman Catholic priests
Canon law jurists